Gornje Ledenice  (Cyrillic: Горње Леденице) is a village in the municipalities of Pelagićevo (Republika Srpska) and Gradačac, Bosnia and Herzegovina.

Demographics 
According to the 2013 census, its population was 485, with 10 of them living in the Pelagićevo part and 475 in the Gradačac part.

References

Populated places in Pelagićevo
Populated places in Gradačac
Villages in Republika Srpska